Tales from the Pit may refer to:

Purgatory (Tales From the Pit), a 2014 live album by heavy metal band Five Finger Death Punch
Tales from the Pit, a podcast created by Michael Swaim
 Tales from the Pit, a spoken-word show series by Jake Roberts